"Freedom of Choice" is a song by the American new wave band Devo, written by Mark Mothersbaugh and Gerald Casale. It appears on the album of the same name.

The line, "In ancient Rome there was a poem about a dog who had two bones. He picked at one, he licked the other, he went in circles 'till he dropped dead", resembles the Buridan's ass paradox about the nature of free will, with a dog changed for the donkey who dies when he can't decide which bone to eat. Ultimate Classic Rock critic Dave Swanson refers to this line as "a sarcastic view of the main subject".

Record World said that the song had "a pounding rhythm with fight-song choruses."  Swanson rated "Freedom of Choice" as Devo's 10th best song, particularly praising its riff.

The single itself has no defined A or B side and instead instructs buyers to "Use your Freedom of Choice" in deciding which song is on which side. The cover and label include two empty checkboxes on either side which allow either "Freedom of Choice" or "Snowball" to be the A or B side.

Promotional music video
In the music video to "Freedom of Choice", the band appeared as aliens. This video also featured professional skateboarders of the day.

Chart performance

References

External links

1980 singles
1980 songs
Devo songs
Songs written by Mark Mothersbaugh
Songs written by Gerald Casale
Warner Records singles
Songs about freedom